Oedo Kuipers (born 11 November 1989, in Stroobos) is a Dutch singer and actor in musical theatre. He is best known for playing the role of Mozart in the 2015 revival Mozart! Das Musical.

Biography 
Oedo Kuipers was raised in a musical family. His father is a music teacher and conductor, and his mother and sisters all sing and play instruments. 

Kuipers began acting at the age of eight. 

He attended the Fontys Conservatory in Tilburg for five years and completed his education in 2013.

Performances

Discography

Solo albums 

 Coverart (HitSquad Records, 2016)
 Pure (HitSquad Records, 2018)

Cast Recordings 

 Mozart! - Das Musical - Gesamtaufname Live (HitSquad Records, 2015); 29 tracks
 Matterhorn - das Musical (HitSquad Records, 2018); 8 tracks

References

External links
 Official website

1989 births
Living people
Dutch male singers
Dutch male musical theatre actors
People from Achtkarspelen